Bir El Djir is a town located close north-east of Oran in the Oran Province, Algeria. According to the 2009 census it has a population of 171,883.

University 
Bir El Djir hosts the University of Oran 2 Mohamed Ben Ahmed

2022 Mediterranean Games
Bir El Djir is one of the three venues that will held the  2022 Mediterranean Games in Oran.

See also 

 Bir El Djir District
 List of universities in Algeria

References

Communes of Oran Province